Gonzalo "Lito" G. Puyat II (May 21, 1933 – January 7, 2013) was a Filipino sport administrator and politician. Puyat was the longest-serving president of the Basketball Association of the Philippines from 1968 to 1995 and was the president of FIBA for two terms from 1976 to 1984. Puyat later became an honorary president after his tenure as president of FIBA.

Puyat was elected as the city councilor of the 4th district of Manila in 1967. He became the minority floor leader in 1969 and was reelected as city councilor in 1971. Puyat was also elected as Manila's opposition assemblyman in 1984. After his term as assemblyman, he unsuccessfully ran for Mayor of Manila.

Puyat died on January 7, 2013, due to cardiac arrest. He was reportedly rushed to the Makati Medical Center due to an asthma attack.

References

1933 births
2013 deaths
Nacionalista Party politicians
Basketball people in the Philippines
People from Manila
Members of the House of Representatives of the Philippines from Manila
Manila City Council members
Members of the Batasang Pambansa